Ahva (Brotherhood) was a short-lived political party in Israel, one of several spinoffs created by the collapse of Dash.

Background
Ahva was formed on 8 July 1980 when two MKs (Shafik Asaad and Shlomo Eliyahu) broke away from the Democratic Movement, itself a relatively new party, having been formed in 1978 when Dash split up (also creating Shinui and Ya'ad). On 17 September they were joined by Akiva Nof, also from the Democratic Movement.

However, like its two immediate predecessors, Ahva also suffered from instability. Nof defected to Likud on 28 January 1981, whilst Asaad left the party to join Telem (another newly formed party) on 15 June. By the end of the Knesset session in June 1981, only Eliayhu remained in the party (though it had outlasted the Democratic Movement, which folded in March 1981).

The party did not run in the 1981 elections and subsequently disappeared.

References

External links

Party history Knesset website

Defunct political parties in Israel
Political parties established in 1980
1980 establishments in Israel
Political parties disestablished in 1981
1981 disestablishments in Israel